In biology, scaffold proteins are crucial regulators of many key signalling pathways.  Although scaffolds are not strictly defined in function, they are known to interact and/or bind with multiple members of a signalling pathway, tethering them into complexes.  In such pathways, they regulate signal transduction and help localize pathway components (organized in complexes) to specific areas of the cell such as the plasma membrane, the cytoplasm, the nucleus, the Golgi, endosomes, and the mitochondria.

History

The first signaling scaffold protein discovered was the Ste5 protein from the yeast Saccharomyces cerevisiae.  Three distinct domains of Ste5 were shown to associate with the protein kinases Ste11, Ste7, and Fus3 to form a multikinase complex.

Function
Scaffold proteins act in at least four ways: tethering signaling components, localizing these components to specific areas of the cell, regulating signal transduction by coordinating positive and negative feedback signals, and insulating correct signaling proteins from competing proteins.

Tethering signaling components
This particular function is considered a scaffold's most basic function.  Scaffolds assemble signaling components of a cascade into complexes.  This assembly may be able to enhance signaling specificity by preventing unnecessary interactions between signaling proteins, and enhance signaling efficiency by increasing the proximity and effective concentration of components in the scaffold complex.  A common example of how scaffolds enhance specificity is a scaffold that binds a protein kinase and its substrate, thereby ensuring specific kinase phosphorylation.  Additionally, some signaling proteins require multiple interactions for activation and scaffold tethering may be able to convert these interactions into one interaction that results in multiple modifications.  Scaffolds may also be catalytic as interaction with signaling proteins may result in allosteric changes of these signaling components. Such changes may be able to enhance or inhibit the activation of these signaling proteins.  An example is the Ste5 scaffold in the mitogen-activated protein kinase (MAPK) pathway.  Ste5 has been proposed to direct mating signaling through the Fus3 MAPK by catalytically unlocking this particular kinase for activation by its MAPKK Ste7.

Localization of signaling components in the cell
Scaffolds localize the signaling reaction to a specific area in the cell, a process that could be important for the local production of signaling intermediates.  A particular example of this process is the scaffold, A-kinase anchor proteins (AKAPs), which target cyclic AMP-dependent protein kinase (PKA) to various sites in the cell.  This localization is able to locally regulate PKA and results in the local phosphorylation by PKA of its substrates.

Coordinating positive and negative feedback
Many hypotheses about how scaffolds coordinate positive and negative feedback come from engineered scaffolds and mathematical modeling.  In three-kinase signaling cascades, scaffolds bind all three kinases, enhancing kinase specificity and restricting signal amplification by limiting kinase phosphorylation to only one downstream target. These abilities may be related to stability of the interaction between the scaffold and the kinases, the basal phosphatase activity in the cell, scaffold location, and expression levels of the signaling components.

Insulating correct signaling proteins from inactivation
Signaling pathways are often inactivated by enzymes that reverse the activation state and/or induce the degradation of signaling components.  Scaffolds have been proposed to protect activated signaling molecules from inactivation and/or degradation.  Mathematical modeling has shown that kinases in a cascade without scaffolds have a higher probability of being dephosphorylated by phosphatases before they are even able to phosphorylate downstream targets. Furthermore, scaffolds have been shown to insulate kinases from substrate- and ATP-competitive inhibitors.

Scaffold protein summary

Huntingtin protein

Huntingtin protein co-localizes with ATM repair protein at sites of DNA damage.  Huntingtin is a scaffolding protein in the ATM oxidative DNA damage response complex.  Huntington’s disease patients with aberrant huntingtin protein are deficient in repair of oxidative DNA damage.  Oxidative DNA damage appears to underlie Huntington’s disease pathogenesis.   Huntington’s disease is likely caused by the dysfunction of mutant huntingtin scaffold protein in DNA repair leading to increased oxidative DNA damage in metabolically active cells.

Other usage of the term Scaffold Protein

On some other instances in biology (not necessarily about cell signaling), the term "Scaffold protein" is used in a broader sense, where a protein holds several things together for any purpose. 

In chromosome folding Chromosome scaffold has important role to hold the chromatin into compact chromosome. Chromosome scaffold is made of proteins including condensin, topoisomerase IIα  and kinesin family member 4 (KIF4) Chromosome scaffold constituent proteins are also called scaffold protein. 
In enzymatic reaction Large multifunctional enzymes that performs a series or chain of reaction in a common pathway, sometimes called scaffold proteins. such as Pyruvate dehydrogenase. 
In molecule shape formation  An enzyme or structural protein that holds several molecules together to hold them in proper spatial arrangement, such as Iron sulphur cluster scaffold proteins.
Structural scaffold In cytoskeleton and ECM, the molecules provide mechanical scaffold. Such as type 4 collagen

References

Cell biology
Signal transduction
Cell signaling